Newark Collegiate Academy (NCA) is a four-year charter public high school located in Newark in Essex County, New Jersey, United States, operating as part of the TEAM Academy Charter School network of charter schools in Newark run by the Knowledge Is Power Program (KIPP) which serves students in kindergarten through twelfth grade. NCA opened in August 2007 and will ultimately serve over 570 students, mostly matriculating from TEAM's middle schools, Rise and TEAM Academies.

As of the 2021–22 school year, the school had an enrollment of 5,671 students and 271.0 classroom teachers (on an FTE basis), for a student–teacher ratio of 20.9:1. There were 4,410 students (77.8% of enrollment) eligible for free lunch and 659 (11.6% of students) eligible for reduced-cost lunch.

Awards, recognition and rankings
The school was the 288th-ranked public high school in New Jersey out of 339 schools statewide in New Jersey Monthly magazine's September 2014 cover story on the state's "Top Public High Schools".

Athletics
The Newark Collegiate Academy Panthers compete in the Super Essex Conference, which is comprised of public and private high schools in Essex County and was established following a reorganization of sports leagues in Northern New Jersey under the auspices of the New Jersey State Interscholastic Athletic Association (NJSIAA). With 552 students in grades 10-12, the school was classified by the NJSIAA for the 2019–20 school year as Group II for most athletic competition purposes, which included schools with an enrollment of 486 to 758 students in that grade range. The football team competes in the National White division of the North Jersey Super Football Conference, which includes 112 schools competing in 20 divisions, making it the nation's biggest football-only high school sports league. The school was classified by the NJSIAA as Group II South for football for 2018–2020.

School colors are navy blue and white. Sports offered by the school include volleyball (women), basketball (men), basketball (women), cross country (men), cross country (women), football, soccer (women), soccer (men), track and field spring (men), track and field spring (women), track and field winter (men) and track and field winter (women).

References

External links 
Newark Collegiate Academy website
School data for TEAM Academy Charter School, National Center for Education Statistics

2007 establishments in New Jersey
Charter schools in New Jersey
Education in Newark, New Jersey
Educational institutions established in 2007
High schools in Newark, New Jersey
Public elementary schools in New Jersey
Public high schools in Essex County, New Jersey
Public middle schools in New Jersey